Margot Zemach (November 30, 1931 – May 21, 1989) was an American illustrator of more than forty children's books, some of which she also wrote. Many were adaptations of folk tales from around the world, especially Yiddish and other Eastern European stories. She and her husband Harvey Fischtrom, writing as Harve Zemach, collaborated on several picture books including Duffy and the Devil for which she won the 1974 Caldecott Medal.

Life

Margot Zemach was born in Los Angeles. When she was growing up there during the Great Depression, she used drawing to make people laugh but she never had enough paper. She studied at the Los Angeles County Art Institute and, on a Fulbright Scholarship in 1955–1956, at the Academy of Fine Arts Vienna in Austria.

In 1957, Zemach married Harvey Fischtrom (1933–1974). They had four daughters, including Kaethe Zemach who is another writer and illustrator of children's books. Margot Zemach died in Berkeley, California on May 21, 1989, of amyotrophic lateral sclerosis, or Lou Gehrig's disease.

Career

Zemach began her career when Fischtrom urged her to do children's books. Houghton Mifflin published their first collaboration in 1959, Small boy is listening, based on their experiences in Vienna. She did the illustrations and he did the text under the pseudonym Harve Zemach. Next year Little, Brown published her work with another writer, Take a Giant Step by Hannelore Hahn.

The husband-and-wife team produced 13 books together, often simply as "Harvey & Margot Zemach" although he wrote and she illustrated. For Duffy and the Devil: a Cornish tale (1973), Margot won the Caldecott Medal from the American Library Association recognizing the year's best-illustrated U.S. children's picture book. The book was also a finalist for the annual National Book Award, Children's Literature and it was named to the Lewis Carroll Shelf Award list in 1976. Zemach was one of the Caldecott runners-up in 1970 for The Judge: An Untrue Tale, written by Harve, and in 1978 for It Could Always Be Worse: A Yiddish Folk Tale, which she retold.

Kaethe Zemach's first publication was her only collaboration with her parents, published the year after her father died. The Princess and Froggie (Farrar, Straus and Giroux, 1975) was a collection of stories written by Harve and Kaethe, illustrated by Margot.

For her contribution as a children's illustrator, Zemach was 1980 and 1988 U.S. nominee for the biennial, international Hans Christian Andersen Award, the highest international recognition for creators of children's books.

A manuscript by Margot for a picture book about sibling rivalry, based on her children, was illustrated by Kaethe and published by Arthur A. Levine Books in 2005, Eating up Gladys.

Selected works

As writer and illustrator

 1963, The Three Sillies
 1976, It Could always be Worse: A Yiddish Folk Tale
 1976, Hush, Little Baby, a traditional lullaby
 1983, The Little Red Hen: An Old Story
 1982, Jake and Honeybunch go to Heaven
 1986, The Three Wishes: An Old Story
 1988, The Three Little Pigs: An Old Story
 2001, Some from the Moon, Some from the Sun: Poems and Songs for Everyone, traditional poems and songs

Written by Harve Zemach
Margot Zemach illustrated picture books written by her husband as Harve Zemach. At least some book covers credited them simply as "Harve & Margot Zemach".

 1959, Small Boy is Listening (Houghton Mifflin)
 1961, A Hat with a Rose
 1964, Nail Soup: A Swedish Folk Tale
 1965, Salt: A Russian Tale
 1965, The Tricks of Master Dabble
 1966, Mommy, Buy Me a China Doll: Adapted From an Ozark Children's Song
 1966, The Speckled Hen: A Russian Nursery Rhyme
 1967, Too Much Nose: An Italian Tale
 1969, The Judge: An Untrue Tale
 1970, Awake and Dreaming
 1971, A Penny A Look: An Old Story
 1973, Duffy and the Devil (a Cornish tale)
 1975, The Princess and Froggie, stories by Harve Zemach and Kaethe Zemach

As illustrator with other writers

 1960, Take a Giant Step, Hannelore Hahn (Little, Brown and Company)
 1967, Mazel and Shlimazel, or The Milk of a Lioness, Isaac Bashevis Singer
 1968, When Shlemiel went to Warsaw & Other Stories, by Issac Bashevis Singer
 1971, Alone in the Wild Forest, by Issac Bashevis Singer
 1972, Simon Boom Gives a Wedding, by Yuri Suhl
 1973, The Foundling and Other Tales of Prydain by Lloyd Alexander (first ed. only)
 1976, Naftali the Storyteller and his Horse, Sus: And Other Stories, by Issac Bashevis Singer
 1982, The Cat's Elbow and Other Secret Languages, by Alvin Schwartz
 1985, The Sign in Mendel's Window, by Mildred Phillips
 1987, The Two Foolish Cats: Suggested by a Japanese Folktale, by Yoshiko Uchida
 1988, The Chinese Mirror, by Mirra Ginsburg
 1988, Sing a Song of Popcorn: Every Child's Book of Poems, by Beatrice Schenk de Regniers
 1989, All God's Critters got a Place in the Choir, by Bill Staines

As writer only

 2005, Eating Up Gladys, illustrated by Kaethe Zemach

References

 Contemporary Authors Online, Thomson Gale, 2007.

External links

 "Margot Zemach" at Embracing the Child
 
 Harve Zemach at LC Authorities, with 16 records, and at WorldCat
 Kaethe Zemach at LC Authorities, with 12 records, and at WorldCat 

1931 births
1989 deaths
American women illustrators
Caldecott Medal winners
American children's book illustrators
Neurological disease deaths in California
Deaths from motor neuron disease
Artists from Los Angeles
Writers from Los Angeles
American children's writers
American women children's writers
20th-century American women writers
20th-century American artists
20th-century American women artists
Academy of Fine Arts Vienna alumni